Intermountain Health (formerly Intermountain Healthcare) is a not-for-profit healthcare system and is the largest healthcare provider in the Intermountain West of the United States. Intermountain Health provides ambulatory and acute health services, along with other medical services, through 385 clinics and 33 hospitals in Utah, Idaho, Nevada and additional affiliations in other areas. It also offers integrated managed care under the insurance brand "SelectHealth." Intermountain Health is headquartered in Salt Lake City, Utah, and has more than 42,000 employees. Intermountain and Colorado-based SCL Health announced that they completed their merger on April 1st, 2022. The combined system employs more than 58,000 people and operates 33 hospitals.

History
Intermountain Health was founded on April 1, 1975, after the Church of Jesus Christ of Latter-day Saints donated fifteen hospitals, as a system, to the intermountain community.

In 1982, Intermountain Healthcare began providing non-hospital services such as clinics and home healthcare. 

In 2006, Intermountain renamed its health insurance plan "SelectHealth" and formalized the separate management of the insurance side of the organization.

In 2009, Intermountain Healthcare was identified as a healthcare model by President Barack Obama, "We have long known that some places, like the Intermountain Healthcare in Utah. . ., offer high-quality care at a cost below average." According to the Kaiser Family Foundation, Utah's per capita spending on healthcare is 44 percent below the national average.

Intermountain Healthcare announced that beginning in 2011, it would offer health insurance benefits for its employees' domestic partners.

Intermountain Healthcare operates 25 hospitals in Utah and Idaho. Intermountain also operates 225 clinics and urgent care facilities in Utah, Idaho, and Nevada, 160 of which are run by physicians as part of the Intermountain Medical Group. In total, Intermountain Healthcare employs about 2,800 physicians and advanced practice providers. Intermountain also provides insurance to nearly one million people in Utah, Idaho, and Nevada. It is also the largest private employer in Utah.

In response to drug shortages and pricing scandals, Intermountain Healthcare and other hospitals formed a generic drug manufacturer, Civica Rx, in 2018 to produce generic drugs that are in short supply or highly-priced.

In October 2020, Intermountain Healthcare and Sanford Health signed an intent to merge. The merger would make Sanford Health a subsidiary of Intermountain Healthcare with the resulting system consisting of 70 hospitals with 89,000 employees. In early December, the merger was postponed indefinitely after the C.E.O. of Sanford Health, Kelby Krabbenhoft was abruptly replaced by Bill Gassen after Krabbenhoft voiced anti-mask sentiments.

In early 2022, Intermountain Healthcare created program for those suffering from long-haul COVID-19 symptoms.

Intermountain completed a merger with SCL Health on April 1, 2022, expanding the healthcare systems reach into Colorado, Kansas, and Montana. 

Intermountain changed its name from Intermountain Healthcare to Intermountain Health in 2023.

Hospitals
Intermountain Healthcare operates 33 hospitals in Utah, Colorado, Idaho, and Montana, with 4,700 licensed beds, as listed in the table below.

Life Flight

Life Flight originally began service in 1972 with just fixed-winged aircraft, but on July 6, 1978, it performed its first patient transport by helicopter, becoming the seventh helicopter (rotor wing) air medical service in the United States.

Intermountain currently operates one Agusta A109K2 helicopter and five Agusta AW109 SP Grand helicopters. In addition to servicing Utah, Life Flight transports patients from Arizona, Idaho, Montana, Nevada, Wyoming, and other locations in the Western United States.

Life Flight and its staff are Commission on Accreditation of Medical Transport Systems (CAMTS) certified.

See also
 List of hospitals in Utah
 Alta View Hospital hostage incident

References

External links

 

 
Companies based in Salt Lake City
Economy of the Western United States
Hospital networks in the United States
1975 establishments in Utah
American companies established in 1975